Aleppo International Airport  is an international airport serving Aleppo, Syria. The airport is serving as a secondary hub for Syrian Air and Cham Wings.

History

The history of the airport dates back to the beginning of the 20th century during the French Mandate. In 1924, KLM Royal Dutch Airlines made their first flight from Amsterdam to Batavia, Dutch East Indies, through the airport in Aleppo. The airport was upgraded and developed over the years until 1999 when the new current terminal was inaugurated.

In January 2013, the facility closed due to the Syrian Civil War, but after Syrian Army advances were made in the area, the airport briefly re-opened on 22 January 2014, welcoming its first civilian flight in more than 1 year (flights were suspended in December 2012), carrying foreign journalists to the city. 

Following the Syrian government's recapture of eastern Aleppo during the Battle of Aleppo, an airplane conducted its first flight from the airport in four years. The flight, conducted on 5 January 2017, was a trial attempt by the government before the airport fully opens to the public.

On 17 February 2020, Syrian Transport Minister Ali Hammoud announced that the airport will resume civilian operations, with the first flight from Damascus to Aleppo scheduled for February 19, and an additional route to Cairo soon thereafter. On 1 March 2020, the airport was targeted by Turkish drone and artillery strikes. As of 31 May 2021, Mohammad al-Masri is the director of the airport.

After an eight-year hiatus due to the Syrian Civil War, flights have resumed on 19 February 2020, with the inaugural flight originating from Damascus International Airport. On 15 January 2021, scheduled flights to Beirut and Erbil were resumed after hiatus due to the COVID-19 pandemic. In June 2022, after the Israeli bombing of Damascus International Airport, all Cham Wings Air flights from Damascus were rerouted to Aleppo.

On 7 March 2023, Israeli Air Force warplanes struck the airport from the direction of the Mediterranean Sea, west of Latakia, with air-to-surface missiles against suspected Iranian weapons transfers, damaging the runway and putting it out of service. The Syrian transport ministry said that the delivery of humanitarian aid to Idlib Governorate following the February earthquake would be rerouted to Damascus International Airport after the "Israeli aggression".

Facilities
Aleppo International Airport has a modern terminal which combines a modern and Islamic architecture. The total area is 38,000 square meters over four floors. The airport capacity is 1.7 million passengers a year.

Airlines and destinations

Notes

References

External links

Airport at the flightradar24.com

Airports in Syria
Buildings and structures in Aleppo
Airports established in 1918
1918 establishments in the Ottoman Empire